USS Vester (SP-686) was a United States Navy patrol vessel and minesweeper in commission from 1917 to 1919.

Vester was built as a wooden-hulled commercial freight boat of the same name at Boothbay, Maine, in 1876. On 24 May 1917, the U.S. Navy acquired her from her owner, the Delaware Fish Oil Company, for use as a section patrol boat during World War I. She was commissioned on 2 June 1917 as USS Vester (SP-686.

Assigned to the 4th Naval District, Vester operated on patrol duties until 21 October 1917, when she was transferred to the naval district's minesweeping squadron, based at the section base at Lewes, Delaware. Plagued by engine problems, she apparently was unable to carry out many operations with the squadron, spending most of her time alongside the pier. On 11 September 1918, she was transferred back to patrol duties, which she carried out as much as her troublesome engine would permit through the end of World War I and until May 1919.

On 15 May 1919, Vester was decommissioned at Cape May, New Jersey. She was sold to Hayes and Anderton of New York City on 15 January 1920.

References

SP-686 Vester at Department of the Navy Naval History and Heritage Command Online Library of Selected Images: U.S. Navy Ships
NavSource Online: Section Patrol Craft Photo Archive Vester (SP 686)

Patrol vessels of the United States Navy
World War I patrol vessels of the United States
Minesweepers of the United States Navy
World War I minesweepers of the United States
Ships built in Boothbay, Maine
1876 ships